Dayanand Colony is part of the Lajpat Nagar area of Delhi. It falls under Lajpat Nagar-4 in South Delhi. By 1957, it was named after Dayanand Saraswati.

The area is mostly occupied by Punjabis and Sidhis and Multanis who were immigrants from Pakistan. It has the largest wholesale market for ladies suits and saris in Delhi and numerous food outlets.

References

Neighbourhoods in Delhi
New Delhi
South Delhi district